Ruellia vindex (syn. Dipteracanthus vindex, Nees, Ruellia geminiflora var. angustifolia) is a plant native to Brazil, Guyana and Venezuela. This plant is cited in Flora Brasiliensis by Carl Friedrich Philipp von Martius.

References
 Hollowell, Tom, Lynn J. Gillespie, V.A. Funk, and Carol L. Kelloff. (2003) Smithsonian Plant Collections, Guyana: 1989 - 1991, Lynn J. Gillespie. Contributions from the United States National Herbarium, volume 44: 104 pages (including 8 plates). 
  Wilmer A. Díaz P. y Francisco Delascio Ch. Catalog of vascular plants of Ciudad Bolívar and the surrounding area, Estado Bolívar, Venezuela

External links
Web Listing of Plants of the Guiana Shield: Acanthaceae - Cacataceae
  Flora Brasiliensis: Dipteracanthus vindex

vindex
Flora of Brazil